Faustina, Apostle of Mercy is a biographical, Polish documentary film directed by Michał Kondrat. It traces the life of Faustina Kowalska who was a nun of the Merciful Jesus and Polish mystic nicknamed "the apostle of divine Mercy". The film premiered to cinemas in Poland on 29 March 2019.

Synopsis

Following the apparitions of Jesus in the 1930s, Sister Faustina had to disseminate messages of divine mercy to the world. Supported spiritually by the priest Michel Sopoćko and with the help of her visions, she will have the painting "Jesus, I trust in you" painted by the painter Eugeniusz Kazimirowski.

Numerous interviews retrace the post-mortem events of Sister Faustina's work, from the prohibition of the worship of the Sisters of Merciful Jesus to her rehabilitation and the beatification of Sister Faustina in 1993 by Pope John Paul II.

Cast
director:Michał Kondrat
writer: Elisa Bahr
Kamila Kaminska as Sister Faustyna Kowalska
Janusz Chabior as Eugeniusz Kazimirowski
Maciej Malysa as Father Michał Sopoćko

See also
Divine Mercy: No Escape, a 1987 American film which also depicts the life of Faustina Kowalska
Divine Mercy: Sa Buhay ni Sister Faustina ("In the Life of Sister Faustina"; Philippines, 1993)
Faustina (Poland, 1995)
The Last Appeal: The Life of Faustina The Apostle of Divine Mercy (2009)

References

External links

2019 films
2010s biographical drama films
Cultural depictions of Polish women
Films about Catholic nuns
Polish drama films